Thun is a town and a municipality in the administrative district of Thun in the canton of Bern in Switzerland.

 the municipality has almost about 45,000 inhabitants and around 80,000 live in the agglomeration.

Besides tourism, machine and precision instrument engineering, the largest garrison in the country, the food industry, armaments and publishing are of economic importance to Thun.

The official language of Thun is (the Swiss variety of Standard) German, but the main spoken language is the local variant of the Alemannic Swiss German dialect.

History 

The area of what is now Thun was inhabited since the Neolithic age (mid-3rd millennium BC). During the early Bronze Age there were a number of settlements along the lake shore and the Aare. A site at Renzenbühl had a local chief or nobleman's grave which contained one of the richest collections of early Bronze Age artifacts in Europe. The Thun-Renzenbühl axe, dating from 1800 BC, is one of the earliest examples of damascening technique in the world. The gold inlay decoration on the axe may also have a numerical, astronomical meaning. Another site at Wiler contained approximately 1,500 maritime snail shells which were harvested from the Mediterranean and traded over the Alps.

The name of the town derives from the Celtic term Dunum, meaning "fortified town". It fell to Rome in 58 BC, when Roman legions conquered almost all of Switzerland, and it soon became one of the main centers of Roman administration in the region.

The Romans were driven out of Thun, and out of the rest of Switzerland, by the Burgundians around 400 AD. The Aare became the frontier between the Christian Burgundians and the Pagan, German-speaking Alemanni, who lived north. The region was mentioned for the first time during the 7th century, in the chronicle of Frankish monk Fredgar. The town is first mentioned in 1133 as Tuno.

The region of Thun became a part of the Holy Roman Empire in 1033, when Conrad II gained the title of King of Burgundy. The emperors entrusted the Zähringen family, centred in Bern, with subduing the unruly nobles of central Switzerland. Around 1190 Duke Bertold V of Zähringen, built Thun castle and expanded the town. After Bertold's death in 1218, his territories went to Ulrich III von Kyburg.

In 1264 Thun received town rights and in 1384 the town was bought by the canton of Bern. Thun was the capital of the Canton of Oberland of the Helvetic Republic, which lasted from 1798 until 1803.

In 1819 a Military School was founded in the town, which later developed into the main military school in Switzerland. Thun was connected to the railway network of Switzerland in 1859 and telephone access made available in 1888.

Geography and climate

Topography

The center of Thun is located on the Aare, just downstream of the point where that river flows out of Lake Thun, and encompasses both banks of the river and an island between.

From the same survey, industrial buildings made up 5.7% of the total area while housing and buildings made up 26.8% and transportation infrastructure made up 12.1%. while parks, green belts and sports fields made up 4.4%. All of the forested land area is covered with heavy forests. Of the agricultural land, 11.4% is used for growing crops and 15.6% is pasturage. Of the water in the municipality, 0.9% is in lakes and 0.4% is in rivers and streams.

On 31 December 2009 Amtsbezirk Thun, of which it was the capital, was dissolved. On the following day, 1 January 2010, it became the capital of the larger Verwaltungskreis Thun.

Climate
Between 1981 and 2010 Thun had an average of 123.7 days of rain or snow per year and on average received  of precipitation. During this month there was precipitation for an average of 11.7 days. The month with the most days of precipitation was June, with an average of 12.9, but with only  of rain or snow.

Politics

Coat of arms
The blazon of the municipal coat of arms is Gules on a Bend Argent in chief a Mullet of Seven Or.

Elections

National Council
In the 2019 federal election for the Swiss National Council the most popular party was the SVP which received 26.6% (-4.2) of the vote. The next six most popular parties were the SP (16.9%, -2.1), the Green Party (15.1%, +5.6), the glp (10.9%, +4.0), FDP (7.6%, -1.0), the BDP (7.0%, -4.1), and the EVP (5.9%, +0.1). In the federal election a total of 13,904 votes were cast, and the voter turnout was 42.8%.

In the 2011 federal election the most popular party was the Swiss People's Party (SVP) which received 25.5% of the vote. The next three most popular parties were the Social Democratic Party (SP) (19.6%), the Conservative Democratic Party (BDP) (16.1%) and the Green Party (8.9%). In the federal election, a total of 15,012 votes were cast, and the voter turnout was 46.8%.

International relations

Twin & sister towns
From 1996 to 2019 Thun was twinned with Gabrovo in Bulgaria.

Zähringer towns
For 30 years, authorities, associations and other population groups have been visiting the Zähringer towns. In Germany, this friendly alliance includes: Freiburg im Breisgau, Villingen-Schwenningen, Neuenburg am Rhein, Bräunlingen, St. Peter in the Black Forest and Weilheim an der Teck, and in Switzerland: Bern, Freiburg, Burgdorf, Murten and Rheinfelden.

Demographics

Population

, 12.3% of the population are resident foreign nationals. Between the last 2 years (2010-2012) the population changed at a rate of 0.3%. Migration accounted for 0.4%, while births and deaths accounted for -0.4%.

Most of the population speaks German (36,551 or 90.5%) as their first language, Italian is the second most common (728 or 1.8%) and Albanian is the third (511 or 1.3%). There are 399 people who speak French and 31 people who speak Romansh.

, the population was 47.5% male and 52.5% female. The population was made up of 17,629 Swiss men (41.1% of the population) and 2,779 (6.5%) non-Swiss men. There were 19,956 Swiss women (46.5%) and 2,559 (6.0%) non-Swiss women. Of the population in the municipality, 12,265 or about 30.4% were born in Thun and lived there in 2000. There were 15,105 or 37.4% who were born in the same canton, while 5,846 or 14.5% were born somewhere else in Switzerland, and 5,699 or 14.1% were born outside of Switzerland.

, children and teenagers (0–19 years old) make up 17.5% of the population, while adults (20–64 years old) make up 60.7% and seniors (over 64 years old) make up 21.8%.

, there were 15,905 people who were single and never married in the municipality. There were 18,969 married individuals, 2,875 widows or widowers and 2,628 individuals who are divorced.

, there were 7,537 households that consist of only one person and 919 households with five or more people. , a total of 18,153 apartments (92.4% of the total) were permanently occupied, while 1,080 apartments (5.5%) were seasonally occupied and 406 apartments (2.1%) were empty. , the construction rate of new housing units was 5.5 new units per 1000 residents.

 the average price to rent an average apartment in Thun was 1017.63 Swiss francs (CHF) per month (US$810, £460, €650 approx. exchange rate from 2003). The average rate for a one-room apartment was 601.00 CHF (US$480, £270, €380), a two-room apartment was about 784.97 CHF (US$630, £350, €500), a three-room apartment was about 927.87 CHF (US$740, £420, €590) and a six or more room apartment cost an average of 1821.24 CHF (US$1460, £820, €1170). The average apartment price in Thun was 91.2% of the national average of 1116 CHF.

The vacancy rate for the municipality, was 0.1%. In 2012, single family homes made up 46.7% of the total housing in the municipality.

Historic population
The historical population is given in the following chart:

Religion

Of the rest of the population, there were 441 members of an Orthodox church (or about 1.09% of the population), there were 37 individuals (or about 0.09% of the population) who belonged to the Christian Catholic Church, and there were 1,823 individuals (or about 4.51% of the population) who belonged to another Christian church. There were 17 individuals (or about 0.04% of the population) who were Jewish, and 1,365 (or about 3.38% of the population) who were Muslim. There were 115 individuals who were Buddhist, 347 individuals who were Hindu and 35 individuals who belonged to another church. 2,765 (or about 6.85% of the population) belonged to no church, are agnostic or atheist, and 1,246 individuals (or about 3.09% of the population) did not answer the question.

Economy
, Thun had an unemployment rate of 2.41%. , there were a total of 28,536 people employed in the municipality. Of these, there were 114 people employed in the primary economic sector and about 44 businesses involved in this sector. The secondary sector employs 6,625 people and there were 450 businesses in this sector. The tertiary sector employs 21,797 people, with 2,696 businesses in this sector. There were 20,515 residents of the municipality who were employed in some capacity, of which females made up 44.5% of the workforce.

 there were a total of 20,331 full-time equivalent jobs. The number of jobs in the primary sector was 66, of which 63 were in agriculture, 1 was in forestry or lumber production and 1 was in fishing or fisheries. The number of jobs in the secondary sector was 6,159 of which 3,898 or (63.3%) were in manufacturing and 2,092 (34.0%) were in construction. The number of jobs in the tertiary sector was 14,106. In the tertiary sector; 2,910 or 20.6% were in wholesale or retail sales or the repair of motor vehicles, 918 or 6.5% were in the movement and storage of goods, 968 or 6.9% were in a hotel or restaurant, 345 or 2.4% were in the information industry, 663 or 4.7% were the insurance or financial industry, 1,075 or 7.6% were technical professionals or scientists, 692 or 4.9% were in education and 2,457 or 17.4% were in health care.

, there were 12,673 workers who commuted into the municipality and 9,195 workers who commuted away. The municipality is a net importer of workers, with about 1.4 workers entering the municipality for every one leaving. A total of 11,320 workers (47.2% of the 23,993 total workers in the municipality) both lived and worked in Thun. Of the working population, 27% used public transportation to get to work, and 41.2% used a private car.

The local and cantonal tax rate in Thun is one of the lowest in the canton. In 2012 the average local and cantonal tax rate on a married resident, with two children, of Thun making 150,000 CHF was 12.1%, while an unmarried resident's rate was 18.1%. For comparison, the average rate for the entire canton in 2011, was 14.2% and 22.0%, while the nationwide average was 12.3% and 21.1% respectively.

In 2010 there were a total of 20,367 tax payers in the municipality. Of that total, 6,140 made over 75,000 CHF per year. There were 133 people who made between 15,000 and 20,000 per year. The greatest number of workers, 6,238, made between 50,000 and 75,000 CHF per year. The average income of the over 75,000 CHF group in Thun was 113,507 CHF, while the average across all of Switzerland was 131,244 CHF.

In 2011 a total of 2.4% of the population received direct financial assistance from the government.

Public transport

The main node for public transport in Thun is Thun railway station. Here public transport bus service, both within the urban area and connecting Thun with nearby towns, is provided by Verkehrsbetriebe STI. Intercity passenger rail service is provided by BLS AG and by Swiss Federal Railways (SBB CFF FFS). BLS also operates passenger ships on Lake Thun, which reach the station by means of the Thun ship canal.

Main sights
 Thun Castle (twelfth century) with a history museum. This has several sections about medieval armour and weaponry and rural life.
 The Rathaus (town hall), erected in the 16th century
 Lake Thun and the view of the Bernese Alps, including the Niederhorn, Niesen, Stockhorn and Eiger, Mönch, and Jungfrau peaks.
 The Wocher Panorama, the oldest remaining panorama drawing in the world.
 The Kunstmuseum Thun
 Schloss Schadau
 Panzermuseum Thun, with several World War II armored vehicles and weapons

Heritage sites of national significance
The Steamship Blüemlisalp, the former Hotel Bellevue-Du Parc, the former Hotel Thunerhof, the zum Rosengarten House, the Landsitz Bellerive, the armory (Mannschaftskaserne), the former hospital at Platzschulhaus, the Rathaus (Town council house), the Reformed Church of Scherzligen and the Sammlung Historisches Armeematerial (Collection of Historical Military Equipment) are listed as Swiss heritage site of national significance.

Education

In Thun about 57.3% of the population have completed non-mandatory upper secondary education, and 17.6% have completed additional higher education (either university or a Fachhochschule). Of the 4,675 who had completed some form of tertiary schooling listed in the census, 68.6% were Swiss men, 22.5% were Swiss women, 5.8% were non-Swiss men and 3.1% were non-Swiss women.

The Canton of Bern school system provides one year of non-obligatory Kindergarten, followed by six years of Primary school. This is followed by three years of obligatory lower Secondary school where the students are separated according to ability and aptitude. Following the lower Secondary students may attend additional schooling or they may enter an apprenticeship.

During the 2012–13 school year, there were a total of 3,923 students attending classes in Thun. There were a total of 603 students in the German language kindergarten classes in the municipality. Of the kindergarten students, 18.7% were permanent or temporary residents of Switzerland (not citizens) and 29.9% have a different mother language than the classroom language. The municipality's primary school had 2,050 students in German language classes. Of the primary students, 15.7% were permanent or temporary residents of Switzerland (not citizens) and 26.3% have a different mother language than the classroom language. During the same year, the lower secondary school had a total of 1,270 students. There were 12.5% who were permanent or temporary residents of Switzerland (not citizens) and 23.1% have a different mother language than the classroom language.

, there were a total of 5,562 students attending any school in the municipality. Of those, 4,331 both lived and attended school in the municipality, while 1,231 students came from another municipality. During the same year, 427 residents attended schools outside the municipality.

Thun is home to the Stadtbibliothek Thun library. The library has 56,800 books or other media, and loaned out 330,316 items in the same year. It was open a total of 300 days with average of 35 hours per week during that year.

Sports 

 Soccer: FC Thun plays in the Swiss Super League. Their home ground is Arena Thun. On 23 August 2005 FC Thun qualified for the group stages of the UEFA Champions League.
 Handball: Wacker Thun plays in the SHL. Their home ground is the 2,000-seat Sporthalle Lachen. They have won the swiss championship twice.
 Ice hockey : EHC Thun plays in the MySports League, the third tier of Swiss hockey. They play their home games in the 4,000-seat Grabengut.
 Orienteering: Thun hosted the 1981 World Orienteering Championships.
 Freestyle Kayak: Thun hosted the 2009 ICF Freestyle World Championships.
 Thun Tigers: American football club that currently plays in the top division in Switzerland Nationalliga A (American football).The Tigers play their home games at Stadion Lachen in Thun.

In fiction 
 A scene in the spy novel Smiley's People by John le Carré is set here.
 Robert Walser's story Kleist in Thun is set here.

Notable residents 

 19th C
 Eduard Rubin (1846-1920), a Swiss mechanical engineer, invented the full metal jacket bullet
 Niklaus Gerber (1850-1914), a Swiss dairy chemist and industrialist
 Edward Bullough (1880–1934), an English aesthetician and scholar of modern languages
 Renée Schwarzenbach-Wille (1883–1959), a passionate horsewoman, photographer and music-lover about which she kept a photographic diary
 Markus Feldmann (1897–1958), a Swiss politician, member of the Swiss Federal Council 1951-1958

 20th C 
 Drs. P (Heinz Hermann Polzer) (1919–2015), a Swiss singer-songwriter, poet, and prose writer in the Dutch language
 Jean Ziegler (born 1934), politician, professor and author
 Guy Bovet (born 1942), a Swiss organist and composer
 Alexandre Dubach (born 1955), a Swiss violinist
 Peter Maurer (born 1956), President of the International Committee of the Red Cross since 2012
 Stefan Haenni (born 1958), a Swiss painter and a crime novel writer
 Regula Rytz (born 1962), politician, sociologist and historian  
 Philipp Fankhauser (born 1964), a Swiss blues musician and songwriter
 Sandra Moser (born 1969), a Swiss stage and film actress 

 Sport
 Heinz Schneiter (1935–2017), a football player and manager
 Hanspeter Latour (born 1947), a football manager and former goalkeeper
 Walter Balmer (1948-2010), an international footballer, played 20 games for the national side
 Ralph Pichler (born 1954), a bobsledder, competed at the 1984 Winter Olympics
 Markus Eggler (born 1969), a retired curler, competed in the 2002 and 2010 Winter Olympics
 Bruno Kernen (born 1972), a alpine ski racer, bronze medallist in the 2006 Winter Olympics 
 Ivan Rieder (born 1976), a Nordic combined skier, competed in the 2006 Winter Olympics 
 Marc Schneider (born 1980), a footballer, played over 330 games, current manager of FC Thun
 Zdravko Kuzmanovic, (born 1987), a footballer
 Simona de Silvestro (born 1988), a race car driver
 Stjepan Kukuruzović (born 1989), a Swiss-born Croatian footballer
 Nico Müller (born 1992), a race car driver

See also
 Thunerseespiele

References

External links 

 
Tourist information

 
Cities in Switzerland
Municipalities of the canton of Bern
Populated places on the Aare
Populated places on Lake Thun
Cultural property of national significance in the canton of Bern